Patoka Bridges Historic District is a national historic district located in Columbia Township, Gibson County, Indiana and Logan Township, Pike County, Indiana.  The district encompasses two contributing bridges, known as Pike County Bridge #246 and Pike County Bridge #81.  Pike County Bridge #246, also known as the Iron Dongola Bridge, was built in 1884 by the Wrought Iron Bridge Company.  It is a Pratt through truss wrought and cast iron bridge measuring 124 feet long.  Pike County Bridge #81, also known as the Steel Bridge at Houchins Ditch, was built in 1924. It is a camelback through truss steel bridge measuring 145 feet long.

It was listed on the National Register of Historic Places in 2005.

References

Historic districts on the National Register of Historic Places in Indiana
Road bridges on the National Register of Historic Places in Indiana
Buildings and structures in Gibson County, Indiana
National Register of Historic Places in Gibson County, Indiana
Buildings and structures in Pike County, Indiana
National Register of Historic Places in Pike County, Indiana
Steel bridges in the United States